Medora is a neighborhood of Louisville, Kentucky, centered along Pendleton Road and Medora Road.

Geography

References
  

Neighborhoods in Louisville, Kentucky